Mikołajska Street (Polish: Ulica Mikołajowska, lit. Nicholas Street) - a historic street in Kraków, Poland. The street runs from Mały Rynek (lit. Little Square) towards the junction with Westerplatte Street, where it continues as Kopernika Street. The Planty Park is located next to the junction.

The street was outlined during when the settlement of Kraków was granted city rights in 1257. Located east of the centre of Kraków, the street served as a direct route towards to Ruthenia. The etymology of the street's name comes from the Church of St. Nicholas, located by the route. Locally, the street was named Rzeźnicza Street (Ulica Rzeźnicza) due to the numerous stalls selling meat.

Features

References

Streets in Kraków
Odonyms referring to religion